Eight O'Clock Walk is a 1954 British drama film directed by Lance Comfort and starring Richard Attenborough, Cathy O'Donnell, Derek Farr and Maurice Denham. Its plot involves a taxi driver who is tried for the murder of a young girl on a bomb-site. Based on a true story, Eight O'Clock Walk is an anti-capital punishment film (the title refers to the hour at which executions were traditionally carried out) that points out the danger of circumstantial evidence resulting in the death of a mistakenly accused prisoner. It is only by good fortune that the film's innocent protagonist is cleared in this case – and the message is that not everyone might be so lucky.

It was shot at Shepperton Studios and on location in London. The film's sets were designed by the art director Norman G. Arnold. It was the final film of the independent producer George King and was distributed by British Lion.

Plot
Just-married taxi driver Tom Manning is led to an abandoned bombsite by an eight-year-old girl (Irene), who says that she has lost her dog. The kind-hearted Manning gives her his handkerchief to dry her tears. She then runs off, taunting Manning as an April-fool prank. He stumbles and raises a fist at her in exasperation at her behaviour; this is witnessed by Mrs Zunz, a local resident. The girl is later found murdered on the bomb-site, strangled as she sang "Oranges and Lemons" while feeding the ducks.

Manning is picked up by Scotland Yard for questioning and is later arrested and charged with murder, with circumstantial evidence including his handkerchief (found under the body of the girl), a fibre from his coat under the dead girl’s fingernail and the testimony of Mrs Zunz. A wartime pilot who suffered a head-wound, even Manning himself starts to doubt his mind, and wonders if he had suffered from a "blackout".

Manning's wife, Jill, convinced he is innocent, contacts lawyers, but the defending barrister refuses to see her and her  husband, because he wants to preserve an "objective view" on the case. She later wins the sympathy of the junior counsel Peter Tanner, who visits Manning in prison, believes in his protestation of innocence and makes the case his own.

The trial begins at London's Old Bailey, where Tanner is opposed by his father, prosecuting counsel Geoffrey Tanner. The trial is presided over by Justice Harrington, whose wife is in the hospital undergoing a serious operation.

It soon becomes evident that things are going badly for Manning. Jurors are seen expressing their belief in Manning’s guilt even before the trial was over. Irene's mother offers hearsay evidence that Manning had given the victim sweets, breaking down in tears and accusing Manning of murder. Following the testimony of prosecution witness Horace Clifford, all the evidence seems to point to Manning's guilt.

During a recess Peter Tanner sees Clifford outside the courthouse, giving a sweet to a young girl.  He identifies the sweet as having been the same as the sweet found on the murdered girl.

When the trial resumes Tanner recalls Clifford for cross-examination, confronting him with the similarity of the sweets, and instructing a street musician to play "Oranges and Lemons" - the same song that was played when Clifford gave the sweet to the child in front of the restaurant, and the song that the child had sung to the ducks when she was murdered.

Clifford breaks down, and Manning is cleared. The film ends with Tanner Senior and Tanner Junior walking away from the camera to share a drink - their camaraderie intact despite the bitter arguments that have gone before. This father and son have been able to fight fiercely and to carry out their legal responsibilities on opposite sides of the case, despite their friendship.

Cast
 
 Richard Attenborough as Tom Manning
 Cathy O'Donnell as Jill Manning
 Derek Farr as Peter Tanner
 Ian Hunter as Geoffrey Tanner
 Maurice Denham as Horace Clifford
 Bruce Seton as Detective Chief Inspector
 Lily Kann as Mrs. Adeline Zunz
 Harry Welchman as Justice Harrington
 Kynaston Reeves as Munro
 Eithne Dunne as Mrs. Evans
 Cheryl Molineaux as Irene Evans
 Totti Truman Taylor as Miss Ribden-White
 Robert Adair as Albert Pettigrew
 Grace Arnold as Mrs. Higgs
 David Hannaford as Ernie Higgs
 Sally Stephens as Edith Higgs
 Vernon Kelso as Superintendent
 Robert Sydney as Ted Lane, dispatcher
 Max Brimmell as Joe, displaced cabbie
 Humphrey Morton as P.C. Tamplin
 Arthur Hewlett as Reynolds
 Philip King as Prison Doctor
 Jean St. Clair as Mrs. Gurney
 Enid Hewitt as Grace
 Noel Dyson as Gallery Regular
 Dorothy Darke as Charwoman
 Bartlett Mullins as Hargreaves
 Sue Thackeray as Girl
 Ian Fleming as Jury Member
 Henry B. Longhurst as Clerk of Court
 Elsie Wagstaff as Mrs Peskitt
 Patrick Jordan as Prison Guard

References

External links
 

1954 films
1954 drama films
Films directed by Lance Comfort
British drama films
Films about capital punishment
Films set in London
Films shot in London
British Lion Films films
Films shot at Shepperton Studios
Courtroom films
1950s English-language films
British black-and-white films
1950s British films